GFY may refer to:

 Golgi-associated olfactory signaling regulator, the protein encoded by the human GFY gene
 Grootfontein Air Force Base, IATA code GFY
 GFY Press, an independent publisher
 "GFY", a 2022 song by Blackbear and Machine Gun Kelly